André Martín Carrillo Díaz (born 14 June 1991) is a Peruvian professional footballer who plays for Saudi Arabian club Al Hilal and the Peru national team as a winger or second striker.

Carrillo began his senior career in 2009 with Alianza Lima. Two years later, he moved to Sporting CP in Portugal and debuted for his country. In 2016, he joined crosstown rivals Benfica and went on winning the league, cup and super cup in his first season. He was then loaned out for two consecutive seasons, the first to English club Watford in the Premier League, and the second to Al-Hilal SFC in the Saudi Professional League.

At international level, Carrillo has earned 90 caps for Peru since making his debut in 2011, and has represented his nation at four editions of the Copa América (finishing third in 2011 and 2015, and second in 2019) and the 2018 FIFA World Cup.

Club career

Alianza Lima
Carrillo began his football career in the Lima-based youth system of Esther Grande de Bentín, in 2004. Then in 2007 he joined Alianza Lima's youth setup. Finally in 2009, he was moved up to Alianza Lima's first team and made his league debut in the Torneo Descentralizado on 5 December in the last round of the regular season. Playing at home in the Matute Stadium, he entered the pitch in the 75th minute as match eventually finished in 2–2 draw against Universidad César Vallejo.

Sporting CP
On 6 May 2011 it was reported that Carrillo signed a five-year contract with Sporting CP. He was quickly included in the first team and was an unused substitute for the league games in round 2 and 3. Then in matchday 5 and playing from the start, he made his Primeira Liga debut on 19 September 2011 in Sporting's 2–3 away win over Rio Ave FC. He was in the starting line-up again in his second match and provided his first assist in his side's 3–0 win over Vitória Setúbal. Later he provided two assists in Sporting's 6–1 victory over Gil Vicente. Then in his eleventh match, he scored his first league goal in the 74th minute, but it was not enough to avoid a 2–1 away defeat to Braga.

On 2 February 2016, Sporting informed that Carrillo had signed a contract with city rivals Benfica until 2021.

In September 2020, it was revealed that 50% of Carrillo's economic rights at Sporting were owned by a third party based in the British Virgin Islands, set up by Russian billionaire Roman Abramovich. The revelation caused controversy as Carrillo had played against Abramovich's Chelsea in 2014 without this being declared.

Benfica and loans
Carrillo officially joined Portuguese defending champions Benfica on 1 July for the 2016–17 season. On 24 August 2017, he joined English side Watford on a season-long loan with the option for a permanent transfer. For the 2018–19 season, he was loaned again, this time to Al-Hilal FC in Saudi Arabia.

Al Hilal 
On 23 July 2019, Carrillo signed a four-year contract with Al Hilal.

In the opening leg of the 2019 AFC Champions League Final on 9 November, he scored the only goal in a 1–0 home win over Urawa Red Diamonds; Al-Hilal went on to win the title following a 3–0 aggregate victory, which allowed them to qualify for the 2019 FIFA Club World Cup.

International career

In March 2011, Carrillo was called up by Sergio Markarián for Peru's game against Ecuador in which he was an unused sub. In May 2011 he was called up to play in the Kirin Cup, and later also featured for Peru at the 2011 Copa América.

He scored his second international goal on 3 July 2015 in a 2–0 victory against Paraguay in the 2015 Copa América Third Place Match.

In May 2018, Carrillo was named in Peru's provisional 24-man squad for the FIFA World Cup in Russia. He scored his side's first goal in the match against Australia.

In May 2019, Carillo was included in Ricardo Gareca's final 23-man squad for the 2019 Copa América in Brazil.

On 23 June 2021, he scored in a 2–2 draw against Ecuador in the first round of the 2021 Copa América.

Career statistics

Club

International

Scores and results list Peru's goal tally first.

Honours
Sporting CP
Taça de Portugal: 2014–15
Supertaça Cândido de Oliveira: 2015

Benfica
Primeira Liga: 2016–17
Taça de Portugal: 2016–17
Supertaça Cândido de Oliveira: 2016

Al-Hilal
Saudi Professional League: 2019–20, 2020–21, 2021–22
King Cup: 2019–20
Saudi Super Cup: 2018, 2021
AFC Champions League: 2019 2021

Peru
Copa América runner-up: 2019; third place: 2011, 2015

Individual
Torneo Descentralizado Breakthrough Player: 2010

References

External links

1991 births
Living people
Footballers from Lima
Peruvian footballers
Association football wingers
Peru international footballers
Peruvian Primera División players
Primeira Liga players
Premier League players
Saudi Professional League players
Club Alianza Lima footballers
Sporting CP footballers
S.L. Benfica footballers
Watford F.C. players
Al Hilal SFC players
Peruvian expatriate footballers
Peruvian expatriate sportspeople in England
Peruvian expatriate sportspeople in Saudi Arabia
Expatriate footballers in England
Expatriate footballers in Saudi Arabia
2011 Copa América players
2015 Copa América players
2018 FIFA World Cup players
2019 Copa América players
2021 Copa América players
Portuguese people of Latin American descent